Alexis Lucas Delgado (born 24 March 1995) is an Argentine professional footballer who plays as a centre-forward for Fénix.

Career
Delgado started life in senior football with Guaraní Antonio Franco; signing from Boca Juniors. He featured six times in Torneo Federal A, including for his debut against Sol de América on 7 February 2016. Delgado moved to Barracas Central on 2 September. One goal, in an April draw versus Tristán Suárez, in eleven matches subsequently occurred. Primera División team Temperley signed Delgado in July 2017. His first goal for them arrived on 27 April in a win away to Chacarita Juniors, though he was later sent off in the game. He returned on 12 May for a match with Belgrano, netting in a win as they were relegated.

In March 2019, Delgado joined Latvian Higher League side FK Liepāja; terminating his Temperley contract to do so. His first goal came during his second appearance, as he netted in a victory away from home versus FK Jelgava on 5 April. A further goal, against Daugavpils, occurred across twelve games, prior to Delgado mutually ending his contract in early June; exercising a clause that was inserted back in March. Delgado then headed off to Nacional Potosí of the Bolivian Primera División. He'd make just seven appearances, of which only two were starts, before departing at the end of the year.

In September 2020, following months of inactivity after a failed move to Swedish football and the COVID-19 pandemic, Delgado returned to Argentina with Primera B Metropolitana's Fénix.

Personal life
Delgado is the nephew of former Argentina international footballer Marcelo Delgado. On 26 September 2022, Delgado and Botafogo-SP teammates Dudu Hatamoto and João Diogo were accused of sexual assault in Rio de Janeiro. Delgado was released by the club two days later, while Dudu and João Diogo were punished by Botafogo.

Career statistics
.

References

External links

1995 births
Living people
People from San Lorenzo Department
Argentine footballers
Association football forwards
Argentine expatriate footballers
Expatriate footballers in Latvia
Expatriate footballers in Bolivia
Argentine expatriate sportspeople in Latvia
Argentine expatriate sportspeople in Bolivia
Torneo Federal A players
Primera B Metropolitana players
Argentine Primera División players
Primera Nacional players
Bolivian Primera División players
Campeonato Brasileiro Série C players
Guaraní Antonio Franco footballers
Barracas Central players
Club Atlético Temperley footballers
FK Liepāja players
Nacional Potosí players
Club Atlético Fénix players
CSyD Tristán Suárez footballers
Sacachispas Fútbol Club players
Botafogo Futebol Clube (SP) players
San Telmo footballers
Sportspeople from Santa Fe Province